Diochanthrax is a genus of bee flies in the family Bombyliidae. There is one described species in Diochanthrax, D. morulus.

References

Further reading

 

Bombyliidae
Articles created by Qbugbot
Bombyliidae genera